Brother Rice High School is a Roman Catholic all-boys non-residential college prep school with approximately 590 students located in Bloomfield Township, Michigan, United States in Metro Detroit. The school shares a campus with the all-girls Marian High School, Saint Regis Parish and the K-8 Saint Regis School.

History
Located in the Roman Catholic Archdiocese of Detroit, Brother Rice was founded by the Congregation of Christian Brothers in 1960 and named after their founder Edmund Ignatius Rice. Brother was originally located on the Continental railroad tracks. The tracks run through a school courtyard to this day. Many tourists each year visit the historic site.

The school was the site of a labor battle in 2003 and 2004 when a group of teachers attempted to unionize. However, a state court ruled that state labor and union boards have no jurisdiction over private religious schools.

Athletics
The Brother Rice Warriors are also known for their tradition of excellence in athletics having won 72 state championships since their first title, the 1974 basketball championship. The lacrosse team has won the state title 24 times and was the 2008 Inside Lacrosse National Champion.

The Warriors are members of the Michigan High School Athletic Association and compete in the Detroit Catholic League with Detroit Catholic Central High School as their respected arch rival.

Activities
The debate team has won 14 state championships and placed first in the world in the 2007 United Nations Foundation and International Debate Education Association (IDEA) Global Debates.

Notable alumni
 B. J. Armstrong '85 - retired pro basketball player, NBA champion
 Matt Baker '01 - NFL player
 Larry Borom '17 - NFL player
 Mike Bouchard '74 - Oakland County Sheriff
 Brian Brennan '80 - retired NFL player
 Greg Collins '71 - Actor; former NFL player
 Eugene Cordero '96 - comedian and actor
 Brad Galli '07 - sports reporter, WXYZ
 Paul Grant '92 - former NBA basketball player
 Chris Hansen '77 - TV journalist, NBC's To Catch a Predator
 John E. James '99 - U.S. Representative for Michigan's 10th congressional district
 Andy Juett - comedian
 Bob Kula '85 - professional football player
 T. J. Lang '05 - Retired NFL player for Green Bay Packers, Detroit Lions
 David M. Lawson '69 - federal judge
 DJ LeMahieu '07 - Major League Baseball player, 2016 NL batting champion, 2020 AL batting champion
 Mike Lodish '85 - retired NFL player, 2-time Super Bowl champion
 Thomas Lynch - poet
 Matthew Milia '04 and David Jones '03 - folk musicians Frontier Ruckus
 David Morrow '89 - founder of Warrior Sports
 Gerald McGowan '64 - former US Ambassador to Portugal
 Nick Plummer '15 - Major League Baseball player for New York Mets
 Zip Rzeppa '70 - TV sportscaster, author, speaker
 John Shasky '82 - former NBA basketball player
 Thomas Sugrue '80 - scholar and historian
 Gemara Williams '01 - retired NFL player
Timothy M. Maganello '68 - former CEO of BorgWarner
 Mackenzie MacEachern '12 - NHL player for St. Louis Blues, Stanley Cup Champion
 Sergio Perkovic '13 - Premier Lacrosse League for Redwoods

Notes and references

External links

 Official Website

Congregation of Christian Brothers secondary schools
Brother Rice High School
Catholic secondary schools in Michigan
High schools in Oakland County, Michigan
Schools in Bloomfield Township, Oakland County, Michigan
Educational institutions established in 1960
Boys' schools in Michigan
1960 establishments in Michigan
Roman Catholic Archdiocese of Detroit